14K may refer to:
 14K Triad, a Chinese criminal organization
 Gnome-Rhône 14K, an aircraft engine of the 1920s and 1930s
 14K, another term for a Fourteener mountain peak (above 14,000 feet) of the Rocky Mountains in western North America. 
 14K (Death Race), a fictional character in the Death Race film series.

See also
Carat (purity)